A polity is, broadly, any kind of political grouping.

Polity may also refer to:

Businesses and Organisations
Polity (publisher), a British publisher of academic textbooks
Ecclesiastical polity, any system of church governance
Student Polity Association, defunct student governing body at Stony Brook University, New York

Other uses
The Polity, Neal Asher's science fiction universe
Polity data series, state democraticity ranking project